The 1997–1998 Úrvalsdeild kvenna was the 41st season of the top-tier women's basketball league in Iceland. The season started on 4 October 1997 and ended on 28 March 1998. Keflavík won its 14th title after defeating KR 3–1 in the Finals.

Competition format
The participating teams first played a conventional round-robin schedule with every team playing each opponent twice "home" and twice "away" for a total of 16 games. The top four teams qualified for the championship playoffs while none was relegated to the second-tier Division I due to vacant berth.

Regular season
Six teams started the season, down from seven the previous season. In end of October 1997, Breiðablik withdrew its team from the league after suffering loopside losses in their four games.

Playoffs

Bracket

Semifinals

|}

Final

|}

Source: 1998 playoffs

Awards
All official awards of the 1997–98 season.

Domestic Player of the Year

Foreign Player of the Year

Domestic All-First Team

Best Young Player Award

Best Coach

Source

Notable 
On 26 October, the board of Breiðablik withdrew the team from the league after starting the season with 4 losses, including a 124–24 loss against Keflavík on 25. October.

References

External links
Official Icelandic Basketball Federation website

Icelandic
Lea
Úrvalsdeild kvenna seasons (basketball)